Wolf River may refer to:

Rivers

Canada
 Wolf River (Alberta), a tributary of the Sand River
 Wolf River (British Columbia), on Vancouver Island, British Columbia
 Wolf River (Manitoba), a tributary of the Hayes River in northern Manitoba
 Wolf River (Nunavut), on Axel Heiberg Island
 Ontario
 Wolf River (Parry Sound District), a tributary of the Pickerel River
 Wolf River (Sudbury District), a tributary of the Wolseley River
 Wolf River (Thunder Bay District), a tributary of Lake Superior
 Wolf River (Yukon), a tributary of the Nisutlin River

New Zealand
 Wolff River, in Fiordland

United States
 Wolf River (Kansas) in Kansas
 Wolf River (Mississippi) in southern Mississippi, which empties into Bay St. Louis
 Tennessee
 Wolf River (Tennessee), in western Tennessee
Wolf River Conservancy, advocates of the river
 Wolf River (Middle Tennessee), in middle Tennessee
 Wisconsin
 Wolf River (Fox River tributary), a Fox River tributary
 Wolf River (Eau Claire River), a North Fork Eau Claire River tributary

Towns
 Wolf River, Langlade County, Wisconsin, United States
 Wolf River, Winnebago County, Wisconsin, United States

Other uses 
 Wolf River (apple), an apple cultivar

See also
 River Wolf, a river in Devon, England
 River Wolf (disambiguation)